Wu Shaocong (born 20 March 2000) is a Chinese professional footballer who plays as a centre-back or left-back for Süper Lig club İstanbul Başakşehir.

Club career
After being selected for the Chinese U17 team, he played a game on 10 May 2016 against Iran U17 in a 2-1 defeat. His performance impressed Japanese football club Shimizu S-Pulse. On 30 March 2018, Wu made his move abroad to Shimizu S-Pulse's youth team. 

On 3 February 2019, Wu returned to China to join top-flight club Guangzhou Evergrande, who immediately loaned him out to second-tier Japanese club Kyoto Sanga. Despite being promoted to the senior team, he did not receive any playing time for Kyoto Sanga and returned to Guangzhou. He made his senior debut in the final game of the season against Shanghai Shenhua on 1 December 2019, where he came on as a late substitute in a 3–0 victory.

On 16 October 2020, Wu scored his first goal in his career in a 3-1 win over Hebei China Fortune in the quarter-finals of the 2020 Chinese Super League championship playoffs.

On 10 January 2023, Wu signed for Süper Lig club İstanbul Başakşehir on a two-and-a-half-year contract, until the summer of 2025. This made Wu the first Chinese footballer to play professionally in Turkey.

International career
On 24 July 2022, Wu made his international debut in a 0-0 draw against Japan in the 2022 EAFF E-1 Football Championship, as the Chinese FA decided to field the U-23 national team for this senior competition.

Career statistics

Honours

Club
Guangzhou Evergrande
Chinese Super League: 2019

References

External links

2000 births
Living people
Chinese footballers
China youth international footballers
Chinese expatriate footballers
Association football midfielders
Chinese Super League players
Süper Lig players
Shimizu S-Pulse players
Kyoto Sanga FC players
Guangzhou F.C. players
İstanbul Başakşehir F.K. players
Chinese expatriate sportspeople in Japan
Expatriate footballers in Japan
Chinese expatriate sportspeople in Turkey
Expatriate footballers in Turkey